Between Yesterday and Tomorrow may refer to:

 Between Yesterday and Tomorrow (film), a 1947 German film
 Between Yesterday and Tomorrow (1954 film), a 1954 Japanese film
 An album by Ute Lemper